Hong Lei (born August 1969) is a Chinese diplomat and politician, serving as Head of the Department of Protocol, Ministry of Foreign Affairs. He was Chinese Consul General in Chicago from 2016 to 2018 and served as spokesperson for the Ministry of Foreign Affairs from 2010 to 2016. Hong was the 25th spokesperson since the spokesperson system was established in the ministry in 1983.

Life
A native of Fuyang, Zhejiang, Hong Lei graduated from Beijing Language and Culture University in 1991. After college, he was appointed as an official in the Ministry of Foreign Affairs, and over a period of 20 years worked his way up to the position of spokesperson.

References

1969 births
People's Republic of China politicians from Zhejiang
Beijing Language and Culture University alumni
Living people
Chinese Communist Party politicians from Zhejiang
Politicians from Hangzhou
Chinese diplomats
Ministry of Foreign Affairs of the People's Republic of China officials